Kahnuiyeh Darz (also Romanized as Kahnūīyeh Darz; also known as Kohneh Darz) is a village in Darz and Sayeban Rural District, in the Central District of Larestan County, Fars Province, Iran. At the 2006 census, its population was 36, in 8 families.

References 

Populated places in Larestan County